The Cibi is a Fijian war dance, now performed at rugby matches.

Cibi or CIBI may also refer to:

 CIBI Information, Inc., a credit rating company in the Philippines
 Cibi Lake, Yunnan province, China, a lake